Chiuta is a region in the Tete province of Mozambique. Named after its  'mountain'. The administrative center is Manje, approximately 120 km to the west of Tete city. Chiuta is the Chewa name for the Supreme Being.

Populated places in Tete Province